Titanium tetrachloride is the inorganic compound with the formula . It is an important intermediate in the production of titanium metal and the pigment titanium dioxide.  is a volatile liquid. Upon contact with humid air, it forms thick clouds of titanium dioxide and hydrochloric acid, a reaction that was formerly exploited for use in smoke machines. It is sometimes referred to as "tickle" or "tickle 4" due to the phonetic resemblance of its molecular formula to the word.

Properties and structure
 is a dense, colourless distillable liquid, although crude samples may be yellow or even red-brown. It is one of the rare transition metal halides that is a liquid at room temperature,  being another example. This property reflects the fact that molecules of  weakly self-associate. Most metal chlorides are polymers, wherein the chloride atoms bridge between the metals.

 has a "closed" electronic shell, with the same number of electrons as the noble gas argon.

 is soluble in toluene and chlorocarbons. Certain arenes form complexes of the type .  reacts exothermically with donor solvents such as THF to give hexacoordinated adducts. Bulkier ligands (L) give pentacoordinated adducts .

Production
 is produced by the chloride process, which involves the reduction of titanium oxide ores, typically ilmenite, with carbon under flowing chlorine at 900 °C. Impurities are removed by distillation.

Instead of directly using ilmenite, "rutile slag" is used. Crude  contains a variety of other volatile halides, including vanadyl chloride, silicon tetrachloride, and tin tetrachloride, which must be separated.

Applications

Production of titanium metal
The conversion involves the reduction of the tetrachloride with magnesium metal. This procedure is known as the Kroll process:

In the Hunter process, liquid sodium is the reducing agent instead of magnesium.

Production of titanium dioxide
Around 90% of the  production is used to make the pigment titanium dioxide.

In some cases,  is oxidised directly with oxygen:

Smoke screens
It has been used to produce smoke screens since it produces a heavy, white smoke that has little tendency to rise. "Tickle" was the standard means of producing on-set smoke effects for motion pictures, before being phased out in the 1980s due to concerns about hydrated HCl's effects on the respiratory system.

Chemical reactions
Titanium tetrachloride is a versatile reagent that forms diverse derivatives including those illustrated below.

Alcoholysis and related reactions
Titanium tetrachloride has been used to create naval smokescreens, as the hydrochloric acid aerosol and titanium dioxide that is formed scatter light very efficiently. This smoke is corrosive, however.

As indicated by their formula, these alkoxides can adopt complex structures ranging from monomers to tetramers. Such compounds are useful in materials science as well as organic synthesis. A well known derivative is titanium isopropoxide, which is a monomer. Titanium bis(acetylacetonate)dichloride results from treatment of titanium tetrachloride with excess acetylacetone:

With ammonia, titanium nitride is formed. An illustrative reaction is the synthesis of tetrakis(dimethylamido)titanium , a yellow, benzene-soluble liquid: This molecule is tetrahedral, with planar nitrogen centers.

Complexes with simple ligands
 is a Lewis acid as implicated by its tendency to hydrolyze. The reaction of chloride ions with  depends on the counterion.  and  gives the pentacoordinate complex , whereas smaller  gives . These reactions highlight the influence of electrostatics on the structures of compounds with highly ionic bonding.

Redox
The trichloride and tetrachloride have contrasting properties: the trichloride is a colored solid, being a coordination polymer, and is paramagnetic. When the reduction is conducted in THF solution, the Ti(III) product converts to the light-blue adduct .

Organometallic chemistry

An important reaction involves sodium cyclopentadienyl to give titanocene dichloride, . This compound and many of its derivatives are precursors to Ziegler–Natta catalysts. Tebbe's reagent, useful in organic chemistry, is an aluminium-containing derivative of titanocene that arises from the reaction of titanocene dichloride with trimethylaluminium. It is used for the "olefination" reactions.

Arenes, such as  react to give the piano-stool complexes  (R = H, ; see figure above).

Reagent in organic synthesis

Toxicity and safety considerations
Hazards posed by titanium tetrachloride generally arise from its reaction with water that releases hydrochloric acid, which is severely corrosive itself and whose vapors are also extremely irritating.  is a strong Lewis acid, which exothermically forms adducts with even weak bases such as THF and water.

References

General reading

External links
Titanium tetrachloride: Health Hazard Information
NIST Standard Reference Database
ChemSub Online: Titanium tetrachloride

Titanium(IV) compounds
Chlorides
Titanium halides
Reagents for organic chemistry